Edward James Olmos (born February 24, 1947) is an American actor, director, producer, and activist. He is best known for his roles as Lieutenant Martin "Marty" Castillo in Miami Vice (1984–1989), American Me (1992) (which he also directed), William Adama in the re-imagined Battlestar Galactica (2004–2009), teacher Jaime Escalante in Stand and Deliver (1988) (for which he received an Academy Award nomination), Detective Gaff in Blade Runner (1982) and its sequel Blade Runner 2049 (2017) and the English dub voice of Mito in the 2005 Disney dub of  Nausicaä of the Valley of the Wind. In 2018 through 2022, he has played the father of two members of an outlaw motorcycle club in the FX series Mayans MC.

For his work in Miami Vice, Olmos won the 1985 Primetime Emmy Award for Outstanding Supporting Actor in a Drama Series, as well as the Golden Globe Award for Best Supporting Actor – Series, Miniseries or Television Film. For his performance in Stand and Deliver, Olmos was nominated for a Golden Globe Award and the Academy Award for Best Actor in a Leading Role.

He is also known for his roles as folk hero Gregorio Cortez in The Ballad of Gregorio Cortez, patriarch Abraham Quintanilla in the film Selena, narrator El Pachuco in both the stage and film versions of Zoot Suit, and the voice of Chicharrón in Coco.

Over the course of his career, Olmos has been a pioneer for more diversified roles and images of Latinos in U.S. media. His notable direction, production, and starring roles for films, made-for-TV movies, and TV shows include Wolfen, Triumph of the Spirit, Talent for the Game, American Me, The Burning Season, My Family/Mi Familia, Caught, 12 Angry Men, The Disappearance of Garcia Lorca, Walkout, The Wonderful Ice Cream Suit, American Family, and Dexter.

Early life
Olmos was born and raised in East Los Angeles, California, the son of Eleanor (née Huizar) and Pedro Olmos, who was a welder and mail carrier. His father was a Mexican immigrant who moved to California in 1945 and his mother was an American of Mexican descent. His parents divorced when he was seven years old, and he was primarily raised by his great-grandparents as his parents worked. He grew up wanting to be a professional baseball player, and at age 13 joined the Los Angeles Dodgers' farm system, as a catcher. He left baseball at age 15 to join a rock and roll band, which caused a rift with his father, who was hurt by the decision.

He graduated from Montebello High School in 1964. While at Montebello High School, he lost a race for Student Body President to future California Democratic Party Chair Art Torres. In his teen years, he was the lead singer for a band he named Pacific Ocean, so called because it was to be "the biggest thing on the West Coast". For several years, Pacific Ocean performed at various clubs in and around Los Angeles, and released their only record, Purgatory, in 1968. At the same time, he attended classes at East Los Angeles College, including courses in acting.

Career

Theater 
In the late 1960s and the early 1970s, Olmos branched out from music into acting, appearing in many small productions, until his big break portraying the narrator, called "El Pachuco", in the play Zoot Suit, which dramatized the World War II-era rioting in California brought about by the tensions between Mexican-Americans and local police, called the Zoot Suit riots. The play moved to Broadway, and Olmos earned a Tony Award nomination. He subsequently took the role to the filmed version in 1981, and appeared in many other films including Wolfen, Blade Runner and The Ballad of Gregorio Cortez.

Film and television 

In 1980, Olmos was cast in the post-apocalyptic science fiction film Virus (復活の日 Fukkatsu no Hi), directed by Kinji Fukasaku and based on a novel written by Sakyo Komatsu.  His role required him to play a piano while singing a Spanish ballad during the later part of the film. Although not a box office success, Virus was notable for being the most expensive Japanese film made at the time.

From 1984 to 1989, he starred in his biggest role up to that date as the taciturn police Lieutenant Martin Castillo in the television series Miami Vice, opposite Don Johnson and Philip Michael Thomas, for which he was awarded a Golden Globe and an Emmy in 1985. At this time, Olmos also starred in a short training video for the United States Postal Service entitled Was it Worth It?, a video about theft in the workplace.

Returning to film, Olmos became the first American-born Hispanic to receive an Academy Award nomination for Best Actor, in Stand and Deliver, for his portrayal of real-life math teacher Jaime Escalante. He directed and starred in the controversial crime film American Me in 1992, and also starred in My Family/Mi Familia, a multi-generational story of a Chicano family. He had a slight appearance in the video of the American rock band Toto, "I Will Remember" (1995), where he can be seen with actor Miguel Ferrer. In 1997, he starred alongside Jennifer Lopez in the film Selena. Olmos played Dominican Republic dictator Rafael Trujillo in the 2001 film In the Time of the Butterflies. He had a recurring role as U.S. Supreme Court Justice Roberto Mendoza in the NBC drama The West Wing. From 2002 to 2004, he starred as a recently widowed father of a Hispanic family in the PBS drama American Family: Journey of Dreams.

From 2003 to 2009, he starred as Commander William Adama in the Sci-Fi Channel's reimagined Battlestar Galactica miniseries, and in the television series that followed. He directed four episodes of the show, "Tigh Me Up, Tigh Me Down" (1.9), "Taking a Break from All Your Worries" (3.13), "Escape Velocity" (4.4), and "Islanded in a Stream of Stars" (4.18). He directed a television film based upon the show, The Plan. Regarding his work on the show, he told CraveOnline, "I'm very grateful for the work that I've been able to do in my life, but I can honestly tell you, this is the best usage of television I've ever been a part of to date."

In 2006, he co-produced, directed, and played the bit part of Julian Nava in the HBO film about the 1968 Chicano Blowouts, Walkout. He appeared in Snoop Dogg's music video "Vato". In the series finale of the ABC sitcom George Lopez, titled "George Decides to Sta-Local Where It's Familia"; he guest-starred as the plant's new multi-millionaire owner. He has been a spokesperson for Farmers Insurance Group, starring in their Spanish language commercials.

Olmos joined the cast of the television series Dexter for its sixth season, as a "brilliant, charismatic professor of religious studies".

Olmos starred in the second season of Marvel's Agents of S.H.I.E.L.D. as Robert Gonzales, the leader of a rival faction of S.H.I.E.L.D., for five episodes.

Music
Olmos contributed backing vocals to the final song on Todd Rundgren's Something/Anything? album.

Social and political activism 

Olmos has often been involved in social activism, especially that affecting the U.S. Hispanic community. During the 1992 Los Angeles riot in Los Angeles, Olmos went out with a broom and worked to get communities cleaned up and rebuilt. He also attended an The Oprah Winfrey Show episode relating to the L.A. riots as an audience member. In 1997, he co-founded the Los Angeles Latino International Film Festival with Marlene Dermer, George Hernandez and Kirk Whisler. That same year, he co-founded with Kirk Whisler the non-profit organization, Latino Literacy Now, that has produced Latino Book & Festivals around the US, attended by over 700,000 people.

In 1998, he founded Latino Public Broadcasting and serves as its chairman. Latino Public Broadcasting funds public television programming that focuses on issues affecting Hispanics and advocates for diverse perspectives in public television. That same year, he starred in The Wonderful Ice Cream Suit. In 1999, Olmos was one of the driving forces that created Americanos: Latino Life in the U.S., a book project featuring over 30 award-winning photographers, later turned into a Smithsonian traveling exhibition, music CD and HBO special.

He also makes frequent appearances at juvenile halls and detention centers to speak to at-risk teenagers. He has also been an international ambassador for UNICEF. In 2001, he was arrested and spent 20 days in jail for taking part in the Navy-Vieques protests against United States Navy target practice bombings of the island of Vieques, Puerto Rico. On January 5, 2007, he blamed the United States government for not cleaning Vieques after the U.S. Navy stopped using the island for bombing practice.

Olmos narrated the 1999 documentary film Zapatista, in support of the Zapatista Army of National Liberation, a revolutionary group that has abstained from using weapons since 1994. He gave $2,300 to New Mexico governor Bill Richardson for his presidential campaign (the maximum amount for the primaries). In 2020, he supported Joe Biden for President.

He is a supporter of SENS Research Foundation, a nonprofit organization dedicated to treating and curing diseases of aging by repairing the underlying damage caused by aging. A series of animations explaining the concept of SENS has been narrated by him.

Personal life
From 1979 to 1987, Olmos lived in West New York, New Jersey. In 1971, he married Kaija Keel, the daughter of actor Howard Keel. They had two children, Bodie and Mico, before divorcing in 1992. Olmos has four adopted children: Daniela, Michael, Brandon, and Tamiko. He married actress Lorraine Bracco in 1994. She filed for divorce in January 2002 after five years of separation. Olmos had a long-term relationship with actress Lymari Nadal. They married in 2002, and separated in 2013.

In 1993, Olmos was awarded an honorary Doctor of Humane Letters (L.H.D.) degree from Whittier College.

In 1996, he was awarded an honorary Doctorate of Fine Arts from California State University, Fresno. In 2007, after a seven-year process, he obtained Mexican nationality. Asteroid 5608 Olmos is named in his honor.

Sexual assault accusations 
In 1992, a teenage girl accused Olmos of twice touching her in a sexual manner while they watched TV and flirted together. Olmos paid the family a cash settlement of $150,000 in response to the allegations, but denied that they were true. He claimed that the settlement was in fact meant to protect his son, Bodie Olmos, not him.

In 1997, a woman accused Olmos of sexually assaulting her in a South Carolina hotel room.

Filmography

Film

Television

Awards and nominations

Music video

References

External links

 
 
 
 

1947 births
Living people
20th-century American male actors
21st-century American male actors
Male actors from Los Angeles
American male film actors
American male television actors
American male voice actors
American film directors of Mexican descent
American male actors of Mexican descent
American television directors
Best Supporting Actor Golden Globe (television) winners
California State University, Los Angeles alumni
California State University, Sacramento alumni
Independent Spirit Award for Best Male Lead winners
Outstanding Performance by a Supporting Actor in a Drama Series Primetime Emmy Award winners
Film directors from California
Hispanic and Latino American male actors
Hispanic and Latino American film directors
East Los Angeles College alumni
Prisoners and detainees of the United States federal government
People from Montebello, California